The 1980–81 St. Louis Blues season was the 14th for the franchise in St. Louis, Missouri.  The Blues won the Smythe Division for the first time in four seasons, with a record of 45 wins, 18 losses and 17 ties, good for 107 points, and second place overall in the entire NHL.  This was the first time that the Blues had ever accumulated 100 or more points in a season.  The Blues defeated the Pittsburgh Penguins in a five-game Preliminary Round, before losing the Quarter-finals in six games to the New York Rangers.

Offseason

Regular season

Final standings

Schedule and results

Playoffs
Preliminary vs. Pittsburgh Penguins

Quarterfinals vs. New York Rangers

Player statistics

Regular season
Scoring

Goaltending

Playoffs
Scoring

Goaltending

Awards and records

Transactions

Draft picks
St. Louis's draft picks at the 1980 NHL Entry Draft held at the Montreal Forum in Montreal, Quebec.

Farm teams

See also
1980–81 NHL season

References

External links

St. Louis Blues seasons
St. Louis
St. Louis
St. Louis Blues
St. Louis Blues
Smythe Division champion seasons